Stealing Raden Saleh is a 2022 heist action film directed by Angga Dwimas Sasongko and written by Sasongko and Husein M. Atmodjo. The film features an ensemble cast, consists of: Iqbaal Ramadhan, Angga Yunanda, Rachel Amanda, Umay Shahab, Aghniny Haque and Ari Irham. The film follows a group who plans a heist of the The Arrest of Pangeran Diponegoro painting by Indonesian artist Raden Saleh.

Cast

Production
The idea of Stealing Raden Saleh was conceived by Sasongko after his interest in paintings and the work of Indonesian painter Raden Saleh. The film was first announced during the Visinema Pictures' virtual press conference on 18 November 2020, along with then-upcoming projects.

In June 2021, Ramadhan, Yunanda, Haque, Amanda, Shahab and Irham were announced to star. In May 2022, Visinema Pictures revealed the film's first teaser.

Principal photography began on 23 October 2021 in Jakarta, Surabaya, Malang and Pasuruan.

Release
Stealing Raden Saleh was theatrically released in Indonesia on 25 August 2022. The film was also released in Malaysia on 22 September 2022.

The film garnered 2.3 million admission during its theatrical run and it became the seventh highest-grossing Indonesian film of 2022 as of 27 October.

Accolades

References

2020s Indonesian-language films
2020s buddy films
2020s heist films
2022 action films
2022 crime thriller films
Films set in Jakarta